Cristóbal Grez (born 17 December 1987) is a Chilean competitive sailor. He competed at the 2016 Summer Olympics in Rio de Janeiro, in the men's 49er.

References

1987 births
Living people
Cristobal
Chilean male sailors (sport)
Olympic sailors of Chile
Sailors at the 2016 Summer Olympics – 49er
Pan American Games medalists in sailing
Pan American Games bronze medalists for Chile
Sailors at the 2011 Pan American Games
Medalists at the 2011 Pan American Games
20th-century Chilean people
21st-century Chilean people